Óscar Darío Arce Valenzuela (born 15 February 1990) is a Colombian former professional footballer who played as a defender.

Honours
La Equidad: 
Categoría Primera A: runner-up 2011

External links
 
 
 Óscar Arce at playmakerstats.com (English version of ceroacero.es)
 
 

1990 births
Living people
Footballers from Bogotá
Colombian footballers
Association football defenders
Juventud de Las Piedras players
La Equidad footballers
Uniautónoma F.C. footballers
Rampla Juniors players
CSM Corona Brașov footballers
Atlético Bucaramanga footballers
Atenas de San Carlos players
Categoría Primera A players
Uruguayan Primera División players
Liga I players
Colombian expatriate footballers
Expatriate footballers in Uruguay
Colombian expatriate sportspeople in Uruguay
Expatriate footballers in Romania
Colombian expatriate sportspeople in Romania